Armenian Labour Communist Party was a political party in Armenia.

History
On 7 July 2003, the party dissolved as party members merged into the United Communist Party of Armenia.

See also

Politics of Armenia
Programs of political parties in Armenia

Communist parties in Armenia
Defunct political parties in Armenia